Krężel is a village in Gmina Płoty, Gryfice County, West Pomeranian Voivodeship, Poland.

For the history of the region, see History of Pomerania.

References

Villages in Gryfice County